Agnes of Bavaria (1276–1345) was a daughter of Duke Louis II of Upper Bavaria and his third wife, Matilda of Habsburg.

In 1290, in Donauwörth, she married Henry "the Younger" of Hesse (1265 – 23 August 1298), a son of Landgrave Henry I of Hesse (1244–1308). They had at least one child: 
 Agnes, married to Gerlach I, Count of Nassau (–1361).

In 1303, she remarried to Margrave Henry I of Brandenburg-Stendal (1256–1318).  From her second marriage, she had three children:
 Henry II "the Child" (1308–1320).
 Sophia (1300–1356), heiress of Landsberg and the County Palatine of Saxony, married in 1327 to Duke Magnus of Brunswick-Wolfenbüttel (1304–1369).
 Judith/Jutta (b.1302–b.1330), married in 1318 to Duke Henry II, Duke of Brunswick-Lüneburg of Brunswick-Grubenhagen (b.1296–a.1351).

References

House of Wittelsbach
Margravines of Germany
1276 births
1345 deaths
13th-century German nobility
14th-century German nobility
13th-century German women
14th-century German women
Daughters of monarchs